The Nadina River is a river in Range 4 Coast Land District, British Columbia, Canada. It feeds into François Lake at its west end.

Name origin
The name is derived from that of Nadina Mountain, which is near its outlet, the name of which means "standing up alone" in the Carrier language.  The river's actual name in Carrier, not adopted by the geographical names board, is "Nadinako".

Settlement
A post office and settlement at the west end of François Lake, abandoned in the 1960s, was also named Nadina River.

See also
List of British Columbia rivers

References

Rivers of British Columbia
Nechako Country
Unincorporated settlements in British Columbia
Range 4 Coast Land District